Bely (lit. "white volcano") is a basaltic shield volcano in central Kamchatka. The volcano is located in the northern Sredinny Range.

See also
List of volcanoes in Russia

References

Volcanoes of the Kamchatka Peninsula
Mountains of the Kamchatka Peninsula
Shield volcanoes of Russia
Holocene shield volcanoes
Holocene Asia